Resunga Municipality is a municipality in Gulmi District in Nepal. The municipality was established by the government on 18 May 2014 by merging the four existing village development committees of Arkhale, Dubichaur, Simichaur and Tamghas. The municipality is named after the holy place Resunga in Gulmi District.

References

External links
Video of images

Populated places in Gulmi District
Municipalities in Lumbini Province
Nepal municipalities established in 2014